Actinorectispora is a genus from the family of Pseudonocardiaceae.

References

Actinomycetales
Monotypic bacteria genera
Bacteria genera